Merxat Yalkun (born July 20, 1991), known by the Chinese pet form Mi Re, is an ethnic Uyghur Chinese actor and model who came into the acting scene as Zhang Yizhi in Cosmetology High (2014).

Early life
Merxat was born in Ürümqi, Xinjiang, on July 20, 1991. He aspired to act from an early age. He entered Shanghai Theatre Academy in 2010, majoring in acting, where he studied alongside Dilraba Dilmurat and Yuan Bingyan.

Career
Merxat began his career as a fashion model at age 22, when he entered the 2014 Asian Sportsman Contest and emerged as the top 10. He automatically retired from modeling.  Following which in 2013, he signed with the agency Yu Zheng Studio. He signed during his third year of school, which he graduated from in 2014. 

In 2014, he starred in the historical comedy drama Cosmetology High and rose to fame as the character Zhang YiZhi.

In 2015, Merxat starred in the historical drama Legend of Ban Shu. This was his first acting role. The same year, he starred in the fantasy romance web series The Backlight of Love, adapted from Wang Liaoliao's novel of the same title. The same year, he was cast in the youth military drama Deep Blue.

In 2016, Merxat starred in the fantasy web series Demon Girl, an adaptation based on the novel of the same name by Mobai Qianjiu. He then starred in the crime thriller series Memory Lost, based on the novel of the same title by Ding Mo. The same year, he was cast in the fantasy historical epic Zhaoge.

In 2017, Merxat starred in the modern romance drama Love & Life & Lie. The same year, he starred in the romantic comedy television series Above The Clouds.

In 2018, Merxat starred in the historical romance drama Untouchable Lovers produced by Yu Zheng. The same year, he starred in the historical romance drama Legend of Yunxi.

In 2019, Merxat starred in the period suspense drama Please Give Me a Pair of Wings.

In 2020, Merxat starred in the period romance drama Winter Begonia produced by Yu Zheng. The same year, he played the leading role in historical romance drama For Married Doctress.

In 2021, Merxat starred in e-sports romance drama Falling Into Your Smile as the Yu Ming/God Ming. He played second male lead Wei Xuan He in modern romance drama Love Under the Full Moon. He appeared in IQIYI modern romance Sweet Teeth as a guest role, Yin Yu. He starred in a web movie "Kingdom of Women" playing Tang Ao, alongside actress Meng Ziyi. 

In 2022, Merxat stars as a special guest in modern romance drama, Brilliant Cast 8. He plays Mu Chen. He plays the charming Shen Yu in "My Sassy Princess", a drama based on a novel. He also starred in a main role in his second movie, "Journey to the North" where he plays God Cheng Sheng, alongside actress Lai YuMeng. The movie was released on Tencent VIP.   

He is currently filming Yue Lai at Hengdian studios.

Filmography

Television series

Movies

Discography 
Singles

References

External links

1991 births
Living people
Uyghur people
People from Ürümqi
Shanghai Theatre Academy alumni
Male actors from Xinjiang
Chinese male models
Chinese male television actors
21st-century Chinese male actors